Sheila Lowe is a British-born novelist and graphologist who has lived in the United States since 1964. Her first book was published in 1999 and became a bestseller in the Complete Idiot's Guides series. Her second book was released a year later. In 2007, the first edition of Poison Pen, the beginning of her Claudia Rose forensic mystery series came out with a small publisher, Capital Crime Press. When Poison Pen received a starred review in Publishers Weekly, who called it "a dynamite debut," Kristen Weber, then-senior editor at New American Library, picked it up and published the first four books in the series. She is currently the president of the American Handwriting Analysis Foundation.

Awards
 2000 Southwest Writers Conference competition, Mystery/Suspense/Thriller category
 2007 USA Book News, Fiction & Literature: Mystery/Suspense

Bibliography
 Poison Pen 
 Written in Blood 
 Dead Write 
 Last writes: a forensic handwriting mystery 
 Inkslingers Ball 
 Outside The Lines 
 What She Saw 
 The Complete Idiot's Guide to Handwriting Analysis 
 Handwriting of the Famous & Infamous

References

External links
 Official website

Living people
British writers
Writers from London
Year of birth missing (living people)